Abdulmotaleb El Saddik (born March 21, 1969) is a Lebanese–Canadian computer engineer and scientist, currently a Distinguished University Professor at University of Ottawa, a published author and motivator (le.prof). He is the Director of Multimedia Communications Research Laboratory since 2002. He is a member of the Engineering Institute of Canada, Institute of Electrical and Electronics Engineers, Canadian Academy of Engineering and Association for Computing Machinery.

Education 
He graduated from Darmstadt University of Technology with a diploma in electrical and computer engineering in 1995 and PhD in electrical and computer engineering in 2001.

Career 
Abdulmotaleb El Saddik is a researcher, futurist, teacher, public speaker, author, STEM advocate, and technologist. He was elected Fellow of the Royal Society of Canada (FRSC 2020), the Canadian Academy of Engineering (FCAE 2009), the Institute of Electrical and Electronics Engineers (FIEEE 2009) and the Engineering Institute of Canada (FEIC 2010). He was appointed Distinguished University Professor in 2014. He is the recipient of several national and international awards, including IEEE Canada C.C. Gotlieb Computer Medal and IEEE Canada A.G.L. McNaughton Gold Medal.

His present research focus is digital twins with five pillars: artificial intelligence, cybersecurity, IoT and aocial network, multimodal interactions, and quality of experience powered communication networks (5G and tactile internet). He is associate editor of the ACM Transactions on Multimedia Computing, Communications and Applications and guest editor for several IEEE Transactions and Journals. Dr El Saddik has been on technical program committees of numerous IEEE and ACM events. He has been the general chair and/or technical program chair of multiple international conferences, symposia and workshops on collaborative hapto-audio-visual environments, multimedia communications, and instrumentation and measurements.  He is at present the director of Multimedia Communication Research Laboratory.

Patents 

 US8294557B1 “Synchronous Interpersonal Haptic Communication System”, Abdulmotaleb El Saddik, Jongeun Cha, Mohamad Ahmad Eid, Fawaz Abdulaziz A Alsulaiman, Atif Mohammad Alamri, Lara Rahal, Daniel J. Martin.
 US9699182B2 “Electrocardiogram (ECG) biometric authentication”, Abdulmotaleb El Saddik, Juan Sebastian Arteaga Falconi, Hussein Al Osman, granted July 2017
 US9849377B2 “Plug and Play Tangible User Interface System”, Basim Hafidh, Hussein Al Osman, Ali Karime, Abdulmotaleb El Saddik,; Jihad M. Alja'am,  Ali M. Jaoua, Amal Dandashi, Moutaz S. Saleh.

Publications list 
 ResearchGate Abdulmotaleb El Saddik
 Google Scholar Abdulmotaleb El Saddik

Books 

 Haptics Technologies – Bringing Touch to Multimedia

Videos and social media 

 YouTube Abdulmotaleb El Saddik (le.prof)
 Instagram Abdulmotaleb El Saddik (le.prof)

Quotes 

 "It doesn't matter how much wisdom you receive, what matters is how you keep."
 "Life is simple. We should stop complicating it."
 "Smile, be thankful and look forward for a better tomorrow."

References

Living people
Canadian computer scientists
Canadian engineers
Academic staff of the University of Ottawa
Place of birth missing (living people)
1969 births